The IIFA Award for Best Actress is given by the International Indian Film Academy as part of its annual award ceremony for Hindi films, to recognise a female actor who has delivered an outstanding performance in a leading role. The recipient is chosen by viewers and the winner is announced at the ceremony. The current winner of the Best Actress award is Kriti Sanon for Mimi.

Superlatives

 Karisma Kapoor and Kareena Kapoor are the only siblings who won the award.
 Sridevi is the only actress who won the award posthumously.
 Rani Mukerji, Kangana Ranaut, Anushka Sharma, Tabu and Priyanka Chopra are the only recipients who also won the IIFA Award for Best Supporting Actress. Mukerji is the only actress who won both the awards in the same year (2005).
 Kareena Kapoor, Vidya Balan, Kangana Ranaut, Deepika Padukone and Kriti Sanon are the recipients who also won the IIFA Award for Best Debut.
 Kangana Ranaut is the only actress who won in all 3 big categories: Best Actress, Best Supporting Actress and Best Female Debut.

Multiple winners

 3 Wins : Rani Mukerji, Vidya Balan, Alia Bhatt
 2 Wins : Aishwarya Rai, Kareena Kapoor, Deepika Padukone, Katrina Kaif

Winners and nominees
 Winners are listed first in bold, followed by the other nominees.
† – Indicates the performance also won the Filmfare Award for Best Actress‡ – Indicates the performance was also nominated for the Filmfare Award for Best Actress

2000s

 2000 Aishwarya Rai – Hum Dil De Chuke Sanam as Nandini †
 Aishwarya Rai – Taal as Mansi Shankar ‡
 Kajol – Hum Aapke Dil Mein Rehte Hain as Megha ‡
 Karisma Kapoor – Biwi No.1 as Pooja Mehra ‡
 Sonali Bendre – Sarfarosh as Seema
 2001 Karisma Kapoor – Fiza as Fiza Ikramullah †
 Madhuri Dixit – Pukar as Anjali ‡
 Preity Zinta – Kya Kehna as Priya Baxi ‡
 Shilpa Shetty – Dhadkan as Anjali
 Tabu – Astitva as Aditi Pandit ‡
 2002 Tabu – Chandni Bar as Mumtaz Ali Ansari ‡
 Ameesha Patel – Gadar: Ek Prem Katha as Sakina ‡
 Gracy Singh – Lagaan as Gauri
 Kajol – Kabhi Khushi Kabhie Gham... as Anjali Sharma Raichand †
 Preity Zinta – Dil Chahta Hai as Shalini
 2003 Aishwarya Rai – Devdas as Parvati "Paro" Chakraborty †
 Ameesha Patel – Humraaz as Priya Singhania ‡
 Karisma Kapoor – Shakti: The Power as Nandini ‡
 Madhuri Dixit – Devdas as Chandramukhi
 Rani Mukerji – Saathiya as Suhani Sharma ‡
 2004 Preity Zinta – Kal Ho Naa Ho as Naina Catherine Kapur †
 Hema Malini – Baghban as Pooja Malhotra ‡
 Preity Zinta – Koi... Mil Gaya as Nisha ‡
 Rani Mukerji – Chalte Chalte as Priya Chopra ‡
 Urmila Matondkar – Bhoot as Swati ‡
 2005 Rani Mukerji – Hum Tum as Rhea Prakash †
 Kareena Kapoor – Aitraaz as Priya Saxena
 Priyanka Chopra – Mujhse Shaadi Karogi as Rani Singh
 Shilpa Shetty – Phir Milenge as Tamanna Sahni ‡
 Urmila Matondkar – Ek Hasina Thi as Sarika Vartak ‡
 2006 Rani Mukerji – Black as Michelle McNally †
 Konkona Sen Sharma – Page 3 as Madhvi Sharma
 Preity Zinta – Salaam Namaste as Ambar "Ambi" Malhotra ‡
 Rani Mukerji – Bunty Aur Babli as Vimmi "Babli" Saluja ‡
 Vidya Balan – Parineeta as Lalita ‡
 2007 Rani Mukerji – Kabhi Alvida Naa Kehna as Maya Talwar ‡
 Aishwarya Rai – Dhoom 2 as Sunehri ‡
 Kajol – Fanaa as Zooni Ali Baig †
 Kangana Ranaut – Gangster as Simran
 Kareena Kapoor – Omkara as Dolly Mishra ‡
 Vidya Balan – Lage Raho Munna Bhai as Jhanvi
 2008 Kareena Kapoor – Jab We Met as Geet Dhillon †
 Aishwarya Rai – Guru as Sujata Desai ‡
 Deepika Padukone – Om Shanti Om as Shantipriya / Sandhya (Sandy) ‡
 Katrina Kaif – Namastey London as Jasmeet 'Jazz' Malhotra
 Tabu – Cheeni Kum as Nina Verma
 Vidya Balan – Bhool Bhulaiyaa as Avni S. Chaturvedi ‡
 2009 Priyanka Chopra – Fashion as Meghna Mathur †
 Aishwarya Rai – Jodhaa Akbar as Jodhaa Bai ‡
 Asin – Ghajini as Kalpana Shetty ‡
 Bipasha Basu – Race as Sonia Singh
 Katrina Kaif – Singh Is Kinng as Sonia Singh

2010s

 2010 Kareena Kapoor – 3 Idiots as Pia Sahastrabudhhe ‡ (tied with) Vidya Balan – Paa as Vidya †
 Deepika Padukone – Love Aaj Kal as Meera Pandit ‡
 Mahie Gill – Dev D as Parminder 'Paro'
 Priyanka Chopra – Kaminey as Sweety Shekhar Bhope ‡
 2011 Anushka Sharma – Band Baaja Baaraat as Shruti Kakkar ‡
 Aishwarya Rai – Guzaarish as Sofia D'Souza ‡
 Kareena Kapoor – Golmaal 3 as Daboo ‡
 Katrina Kaif – Raajneeti as Indu Patp Singh
 Vidya Balan – Ishqiya as Krishna Verma ‡
 2012 Vidya Balan – The Dirty Picture as Reshma / Silk †
 Kangana Ranaut – Tanu Weds Manu as Tanuja 'Tanu' Trivedi
 Kareena Kapoor – Bodyguard as Divya
Mahie Gill – Saheb, Biwi Aur Gangster as Madhavi Devi ‡
Priyanka Chopra – 7 Khoon Maaf as Susanna Anna-Marie Johannes ‡
 2013 Vidya Balan – Kahaani as Vidya Venkatesan Bagchi †
 Deepika Padukone – Cocktail as Veronica Malaney ‡
 Huma Qureshi – Gangs of Wasseypur – Part 2 as Mohsina
 Kareena Kapoor – Heroine as Mahi Arora ‡
 Priyanka Chopra – Barfi! as Jhilmil Chatterjee ‡
 Sridevi – English Vinglish as Shashi Godbole ‡
 2014 Deepika Padukone – Chennai Express as Meenalochni 'Meena' Azhagusundaram ‡
 Deepika Padukone – Goliyon Ki Raasleela Ram-Leela as Leela Sanera †
 Deepika Padukone – Yeh Jawaani Hai Deewani as Dr. Naina Talwar ‡
 Nimrat Kaur – The Lunchbox as Ila
 Shraddha Kapoor – Aashiqui 2 as Aarohi Keshav Shirke ‡
 Sonakshi Sinha – Lootera as Pakhi Roy Chaudhary ‡
 2015 Kangana Ranaut – Queen as Rani Mehra †
 Alia Bhatt – 2 States as Ananya Swaminathan 
 Anushka Sharma – PK as Jagat "Jaggu" Janani Sahni
 Deepika Padukone – Happy New Year as Mohini Joshi 
 Priyanka Chopra – Mary Kom as Mary Kom ‡
 Rani Mukerji – Mardaani as Shivani Shivaji Roy ‡
 2016 Deepika Padukone – Piku as Piku Banerjee †
 Deepika Padukone – Bajirao Mastani as Mastani ‡
 Kangana Ranaut – Tanu Weds Manu Returns as Tanuja "Tanu" Trivedi / Kumari "Kusum" Sangwan (Datto) ‡
 Priyanka Chopra – Dil Dhadakne Do as Ayesha Mehra / Sangha
 Shraddha Kapoor – ABCD 2 as Vinnie
 2017 Alia Bhatt – Udta Punjab as Kumari Pinky †
 Alia Bhatt – Dear Zindagi as Kaira (Koko) ‡
 Anushka Sharma – Ae Dil Hai Mushkil as Alizeh ‡
 Sonam Kapoor – Neerja as Neerja Bhanot ‡
 Taapsee Pannu – Pink as Minal Arora
 2018 Sridevi – Mom as Devki Sabarwal ‡
Alia Bhatt – Badrinath Ki Dulhania as Vaidehi Trivedi ‡ 
Bhumi Pednekar – Shubh Mangal Saavdhan as Sugandha Joshi ‡ 
Vidya Balan – Tumhari Sulu as Sulochana "Sulu" Dubey †
Zaira Wasim – Secret Superstar as Insia Malik ‡ 
 2019 Alia Bhatt – Raazi as Sehmat Khan †
Deepika Padukone – Padmaavat as Rani Padmavati ‡ 
Neena Gupta – Badhaai Ho as Priyamvada 'Babli' Kaushik ‡ 
Rani Mukerji – Hichki as Naina Mathur ‡
Tabu – Andhadhun as Simi ‡

2020s
 2020 Alia Bhatt – Gully Boy as Safeena Firdausi † 
 Kareena Kapoor – Good Newwz as Deepti Batra ‡
 Priyanka Chopra – The Sky Is Pink as Aditi Chaudhary ‡
 Taapsee Pannu – Badla as Naina Sethi
 Vidya Balan – Mission Mangal as Tara Shinde ‡

 2021-22 Kriti Sanon – Mimi as Mimi Rathore †  
Kiara Advani – Shershaah as Dimple Cheema ‡
 Taapsee Pannu – Thappad as Amrita Sabharwal †
 Sanya Malhotra – Pagglait as Sandhya Giri
 Vidya Balan – Sherni as Vidya Vincent ‡

 2023
 Alia Bhatt – Gangubai Kathiawadi as Gangubai
 Alia Bhatt –  Darlings as Badrunissa
 Shefali Shah – Darlings as Shamshunissa
 Tabu – Bhool Bhulaiyaa 2 as Anjulika Chatterjee / Manjulika Chatterjee
 Yami Gautam  – A Thursday aa Naina Jaiswal

See also 
 IIFA Awards
 Bollywood
 Cinema of India

References

External links 
Official site

International Indian Film Academy Awards
Film awards for lead actress